Nachiketa, also rendered Nachiketas and Nachiketan, is a character in Hindu literature. He is the son of the sage Vājashravas, or Uddalaki, in some traditions. He is the child protagonist of an ancient Indian, dialogical narrative, about the nature of the atman (soul). 

His allegorical story is told in the Katha Upanishad (c. 9th century BCE), though the name has several earlier references. He was taught self-knowledge, knowledge about the atman (soul), and the Brahman (Ultimate Reality), by Yama, the god of righteousness. Nachiketa is noted for his rejection of material desires, which are ephemeral, and for his single-minded pursuit of the path of realising moksha.

Etymology 

The Sanskrit name Nachiketa is composed of three syllables, each of which possess associated cognates:

Literature

Rigveda 
The Rigveda 10.135 talks of Yama and a child, who may be a reference to Nachiketa.

Taittiriya Brahmana 
Nachiketa is also mentioned in the Taittiriya Brahmana, 3.1.8.

Mahabharata 
In the Mahabharata, the name appears as one of the sages present in the Sabha (royal assembly) of King Yudhishthira (Sabha Parva, Section IV,) and also in the Anusasana Parva (106).

Katha Upanishad 

Vājashravasa, desiring a gift from the gods, started an offering to donate all his possession.  But Nachiketa, his son, noticed that Vajashravasa was donating only the cows that were old, barren, blind, or lame; not such as might buy the worshipper a place in heaven. Nachiketa, wanting the best for his father's rite, asked: "I too am yours, to which God will you offer me?". After being pestered thus, Vājashravasa answered in a fit of anger, "I give you unto Yamaraja Himself!"

Despite his father's repentance at his outburst, Nachiketa regarded his father's words to have a divine meaning, and consoling him, went to Yamaraja's home. Yama was out, and so he waited for three days without any food or water. When Yama returned, he was sorry to see that a Brahmin guest had been waiting so long without food and water. To compensate for his mistake, Yama told Nachiketa, "You have waited in my house for three days without hospitality, therefore ask three boons from me". Nachiketa first asked for peace for his father and himself, when he returned to his father. Yama agreed. Next, Nachiketa wished to learn the sacred fire sacrifice, which Yama elaborated. For his third boon, Nachiketa wanted to learn the mystery of what comes after the death of the body.

Yama was reluctant on this question. He said that this had been a mystery even to the gods. He urged Nachiketa to ask for some other boon, and offered him longevity, progeny, wealth, rulership of a planet of his choice, and all the apsaras of his choice instead. But Nachiketa replied that material things are ephemeral, and would not confer immortality. So, no other boon would do. Yama was secretly pleased with this disciple, and elaborated on the nature of the true Self, which persists beyond the death of the body. He revealed the knowledge that one's Self is inseparable from Brahman, the supreme spirit, the vital force in the universe. Yama's explanation is a succinct explication of Hindu metaphysics, and focuses on the following points:
 The sound Om is the syllable of the supreme Brahman
 The Atman, whose symbol is Om is the same as the omnipresent Brahman. Smaller than the smallest and larger than the largest, the Soul is formless and all-pervading
 The goal of the wise is to know this Atman
 The Atman is like a rider; the horses are the senses, which he guides through the maze of desires
 After death, it is the Atman that remains; the Atman is immortal
 Mere reading of the scriptures or intellectual learning cannot realise Atman
 One must discriminate the Atman from the body, which is the seat of desire
 The inability to realise Brahman results in one being enmeshed in the cycle of rebirths; Understanding the Self leads to moksha

Thus having learned the wisdom of the Brahman from Yama, Nachiketa returned to his father as a jivanmukta, an individual who has achieved spiritual liberation while being alive.

In popular culture 
The story of Nachiketa and his conversation with the god Yama has been the topic of many retellings and adaptations in India.

Poetry 

 Vijay Kumar Singh's 2022 poetry collection Shunahshep & Nachiketa, features a poetic retelling of the story of Nachiketa and his philosophical conversation with the god Yama, mentioned in the Katha Upanishad, in the form of an epic poem written in Hindi.

Graphic Novel 

 Amar Chitra Katha new series number 702 titled Nachiketa, published in 1979, tells the story of Nachiketa in the form of a graphic novel.

See also
Vasishtha
Trikaranasuddhi

References

 Sister Nivedita & Ananda K.Coomaraswamy: Myths and Legends of the Hindus and Buddhists, Kolkata, 2001 
 Sri Krishna Prem:  The Yoga of the Kathopanishad, London, John M. Watkins, 1955 (No ISBN)
Swami Krishnananda.org
A History of Pre-Buddhistic Indian Philosophy By Benimadhab Barua
Encyclopaedia of the Hindu world By Gaṅgā Rām Garg

External links

 The Mahabharata, Book 13, Anusanana Parva sacred-texts.com
 The Kaṭha Upaniṣad, in the 1921 translation by Hume.

Rishis
Hindu philosophers and theologians
Ontologists
Characters in Hindu mythology
Upanishadic people